KPOY may refer to:

 KPOY (FM), a defunct radio station (90.3 FM) formerly licensed to serve Fraser, Colorado, United States
 KQNG-FM, a radio station (93.5 FM) licensed to serve Lihue, Hawaii, United States, which held the call sign KPOY from January 1980 to October 1982
 The kenpom Player of the Year award, introduced in 2010 by Ken Pomeroy's kenpom.com honoring the top player in NCAA Division I men's college basketball
 Powell Municipal Airport in Powell, Wyoming (ICAO code KPOY)